Cedarville is an unincorporated community and census-designated place in southern Prince George's County, Maryland, United States. As of the 2020 census the population was 639.

Geography
The CDP is bordered to the northwest by Brandywine, to the north by Croom CDP, to the east by Baden, and to the south by Charles County.

Demographics

2020 census

Note: the US Census treats Hispanic/Latino as an ethnic category. This table excludes Latinos from the racial categories and assigns them to a separate category. Hispanics/Latinos can be of any race.

Education
Cedarville residents are assigned to schools in Prince George's County Public Schools.

Residential areas of the CDP area are zoned to Brandywine Elementary School, Gwynn Park Middle School, and Gwynn Park High School.

References

Census-designated places in Prince George's County, Maryland
Census-designated places in Maryland